Juan Mauricio Ramos Méndez (born 23 September 1969, in Santa Cruz de la Sierra) is a retired Bolivian football midfielder. He played 35 international matches and scored 1 goal for the Bolivia national team, including an appearance in the 1994 FIFA World Cup.

Club career
Nicknamed "Tapera", Ramos initiated his career in 1988, playing for Bolivian club Destroyers, alongside future stars Marco Etcheverry and Erwin Sánchez as teammates. They quickly established themselves as the "Golden Trio" because of their impressive ability and the perfect blend they created on the field. In 1994, Ramos transferred to club Guabirá, where he excelled and became the best player in the league. In 1995, he went abroad and signed for Brazilian team Cruzeiro. While playing in Brazil, Ramos suffered a serious knee injury that kept him away from the sport for nearly 14 months. After his recovery in 1997, he returned to first division football in great shape with club The Strongest before joining the Major League Soccer, where he played for the Tampa Bay Mutiny (1998–99) and the New England Revolution (2000). After leaving the MLS, he played for Bolivian teams Oriente Petrolero, Unión Central and Club San José, where his career came to an end in 2003.

International career
Between 1987 and 1999, Ramos earned a total of 35 caps in the Bolivia national team. He scored his only goal with Bolivia on July 14, 1995 during a 2-2 draw against Chile in the 1995 Copa América hosted by Uruguay.

International goals

|- style="background: #DFE7FF"
| 1. || July 14, 1995 || Estadio Parque Artigas, Paysandú, Uruguay ||  || 2–2 || 2–2 || 1995 Copa América
|}

See also
 List of foreign MLS players

References

External links
 Mauricio Ramos Méndez Futbolistas bolivianos
 

1967 births
Living people
Sportspeople from Santa Cruz de la Sierra
Association football midfielders
Bolivian footballers
Bolivia international footballers
Bolivia youth international footballers
Club Destroyers players
Guabirá players
Cruzeiro Esporte Clube players
The Strongest players
Tampa Bay Mutiny players
New England Revolution players
Oriente Petrolero players
Club San José players
1987 Copa América players
1994 FIFA World Cup players
1995 Copa América players
Bolivian Primera División players
Major League Soccer players
Major League Soccer All-Stars
Bolivian expatriate footballers
Expatriate footballers in Brazil
Expatriate soccer players in the United States
Unión Tarija players